In Search Of The Rainbow Seekers is a 1980 album by R&B group Mtume. This was their second album on the Epic Records label.

Track listing
All tracks composed by James Mtume and Reggie Lucas; except where noted.
"Give It on Up (If You Want To)" (Howard King, Ed "Tree" Moore, Tawatha Agee) - 6:40
"You Can't Wait for Love" - 4:52
"She's a Rainbow Dancer" - 4:56
"We're Gonna Make It This Time" - 4:56
"Dance Around My Navel (Doesn't Have to Make Sense, Just Cents)" (Basil Fearrington, Howard King, D. Spence) - 1:59
"So You Wanna Be a Star" (James Mtume, Reggie Lucas, Basil Fearrington) - 5:16
"Spirit of the Dance" (Hubert Eaves, Tawatha Agee) - 4:18
"Anticipatin'" - 4:22
"Everything Good to Me" - 4:08
"Mrs. Sippi" (James Mtume, Reggie Lucas, Ed "Tree" Moore) - 3:41

Personnel
Mtume
Mtume - backing vocals
James Mtume - lead vocals, percussion, keyboards, backing vocals
Tawatha Agee - lead vocals, backing vocals, percussion
Howard King - drums
Ed "Tree" Moore, Reggie Lucas  - guitar
Basil Fearrington - bass
Hubert Eaves III, Ed Walsh, Pete Cannarozzi - keyboards
Danny Coleman, Sinclair Acey -  horns

Charts

Singles

References

External links
 Mtume-In Search Of The Rainbow Seekers  at Discogs

Mtume albums
1980 albums
Epic Records albums